Central tendon can refer to:
 Central tendon of diaphragm
 Central tendon of perineum